Tabata (written: 田畑, 田端 or 田畠) is a Japanese surname. Notable people with the surname include:

, Japanese footballer
Bruno Tabata (born 1997), Brazilian footballer
, Japanese video game director
, Japanese academic
, Japanese karate grand master
, Japanese baseball player
, Japanese sprinter
, Japanese speed skater and cycle racer
, Japanese politician
, Japanese footballer
Rodrigo Tabata, Japanese-Brazilian footballer
, President of the Japanese Olympic Committee
, Japanese footballer
, Japanese actress
, Japanese sports sailor
, Japanese ryūkōka and enka singer, songwriter, and electric guitarist
, Japanese manga artist

See also
José Tábata, Venezuelan baseball player

Japanese-language surnames